Kościan  is a town on the Obra canal in west-central Poland, with a population of 23 952 inhabitants as of June 2014. Situated in the Greater Poland Voivodeship (since 1999), previously in Leszno Voivodeship (1975–1998), it is the capital of Kościan County.

History
Kościan was founded in the 12th or 13th century, when it was part of the Duchy of Greater Poland of the fragmented Polish realm. It was granted town rights in the second half of the 13th century, which were later confirmed by King Władysław Jagiełło in 1400. From 1332 Kościan was a royal town of Poland. It was a county (powiat) seat in the Poznań Voivodeship in the Greater Poland Province of the Polish Crown. In the 15th century Kościan was famous for its cloth production. King Casimir IV Jagiellon granted Kościan cloths the first industrial trademark in the history of Poland. At the time Kościan was the second largest city within historic Greater Poland (behind Poznań).

Kościan was captured by the Swedes during the Swedish invasion of Poland (the Swedish Deluge) in 1655, but was soon recaptured by a partisan unit led by Krzysztof Żegocki. The town suffered from further Swedish and Russian invasions in the 18th century, and was annexed by Prussia in the Second Partition of Poland in 1793. The Polish Greater Poland uprising of 1794 began in Kościan. In 1807 the town became part of the short-lived Polish Duchy of Warsaw, before being reannexed by Prussia in 1815, and it was restored to Poland after the country regained independence in 1918.
During the German occupation of Poland (World War II), the Polish population was subject to mass arrests, executions, expulsions, deportations to Nazi concentration camps and confiscation of property. The Einsatzgruppe VI carried out public executions of Poles in the town on October 2 and October 23, 1939 as part of the Intelligenzaktion, killing 8 and 18 people respectively, including activists, merchants, landowners, the director of the local narrow gauge railway, the chairman of the local branch of the "Sokół" Polish Gymnastic Society, principals of schools from Kościan and the nearby village of Borowo and one student. In Kościan, the Germans operated a prison for Poles from both the town and the region, many of whom were later transported to the infamous Fort VII in Poznań. On November 7 and 9, 1939, 66 Polish craftsmen, merchants, farmers, local officials and workers, previously held in the local prison were massacred in the nearby forest. Further such massacres were carried out by the Germans in December 1939 and in January and February 1940. The local high school principal was among Polish teachers and principals murdered in the Dachau concentration camp. Over 50 Poles, including local activists, intelligentsia and the families of victims of executions, were expelled in 1939, while 2,139 Poles were expelled in 1940, and their houses were then handed over to German colonists as part of the Lebensraum policy. 534 patients of the local psychiatric hospital were gassed by the Germans in January 1940, and afterwards patients from psychiatric hospitals in Germany were transported to Kościan and also gassed.

Sports
It competes in the lower leagues.

Notable people 

 Dezydery Chłapowski (1788–1879), general and political activist
 Klemens Koehler (1840–1901), physician
 Józef Surzyński (1851–1919), composer
 Feliks Stamm (1901–1976), boxing coach
 Izabella Zielińska (1910–2017), pianist
 Rafał Bryndal (born 1960), satirist and journalist
 Jarosław Jaromi Drażewski (born 1961), musician
 Waldemar Brygier (born 1970), journalist
 Bartosz Jurecki (born 1979), handball player
 Michał Jurecki (born 1984), handball player
 Krystian Klecha (born 1984), speedway rider
 Adam Szłapka (born 1984), politician
 Tomasz Nowak (born 1985), footballer
 Zofia Nowakowska (born 1988), singer

International relations

Twin towns – Sister cities
Kościan is twinned with:

Gallery

References

External links

Official town website

Cities and towns in Greater Poland Voivodeship
Kościan County
Poznań Voivodeship (1921–1939)